The 1908 Ottawa Rough Riders finished in 1st place in the Interprovincial Rugby Football Union with a 5–1 record and qualified for the IRFU playoffs for the first time since its inception in the previous year. The Rough Riders were defeated by the Hamilton Tigers in a league playoff.

Regular season

Standings

Schedule

Postseason

References

Ottawa Rough Riders seasons